Zhu Fushou (born October 1962) is a former Chinese business executive who served as General Manager of Dongfeng Motor, a Chinese automobile manufacturer. On November 2, 2015, Zhu was placed under investigation by the Communist Party's anti-corruption agency.

Career
Zhu Fushou was born in Tongcheng, Anhui in October 1962. He graduated from Hefei University of Technology in 1984 and Zhongnan University of Economics and Law in 2001.
 
Zhu was joined Chinese Communist Party in 1984. He went to Dongfeng Motor and became the General Manager of Dongfeng Motor Wheel Co., Ltd. in 1994. Since July 2001, Zhu Fushou became the General Manager of Dongfeng Motor. Zhu also was the member of the 11th Hubei People's Congress.

On November 2, 2015, Zhu Fushou was placed under investigation by the Central Commission for Discipline Inspection of the Chinese Communist Party, the party's internal disciplinary body, for "serious violations of regulations". At the same day, Dongfeng Motor's stock price fell 1.4 per cent to 11.08 Hong Kong dollars in Hong Kong.

On January 29, 2016, the CCDI announced Zhu was expelled from the party and demoted.

References

1962 births
Living people
People from Tongcheng, Anhui
Dongfeng Motor people
Businesspeople from Anhui
Chinese chief executives in the automobile industry
Expelled members of the Chinese Communist Party
Hefei University of Technology alumni
Zhongnan University of Economics and Law alumni
Automotive businesspeople